Paws of the Bear is a 1917 American war drama film directed by Reginald Barker and starring William Desmond, Clara Williams and Robert McKim.

Cast
 William Desmond as Ray Bourke
 Clara Williams as Olga Raminoff
 Robert McKim as Boris Drakoff
 Wallace Worsley as Curt Schrieber
 Charles K. French as Gen. von Mittendorf

References

Bibliography
 Taves, Brian. Thomas Ince: Hollywood's Independent Pioneer. University Press of Kentucky, 2012.

External links
 

1917 films
1917 drama films
American silent feature films
American war drama films
American black-and-white films
Triangle Film Corporation films
Films directed by Reginald Barker
1910s war drama films
1910s English-language films
1910s American films
Silent American drama films
Silent war drama films